Red Wing is an unincorporated community along the Huerfano River in Huerfano County, Colorado, United States.

Geography
Red Wing is located at  (37.7361158,-105. 2900038). The community lies southwest of Gardner and just east of the Sangre de Cristo Range along County Road 580 in the Huerfano River Valley. The community is agrarian and has many interesting geological features, such as faults, outcrops of Dakota sandstone, and igneous intrusions.

See also

References

External links

Unincorporated communities in Huerfano County, Colorado
Unincorporated communities in Colorado